Atlético Tánger is a Moroccan football club from Tangier currently playing in the third division.

References
 GNFA 1 Unofficial Website

Football clubs in Morocco
Sport in Tangier
2000 establishments in Morocco
Sports clubs in Morocco
Organizations based in Tangier